Paul Goldman may refer to:
 Paul Goldman (director),  Australian film director, screenwriter and cinematographer
 Paul Goldman (politician), American politician in Virginia
 Paul T. Goldman, a comedic docuseries created by Jason Woliner